Atlantoaxial ligament can refer to:
 Anterior atlantoaxial ligament
 Posterior atlantoaxial ligament